Cold Comfort is a Canadian psychological thriller film, released in 1989. The film was written by Richard Beattie and Elliot L. Sims based on the play by Jim Garrard, and directed by Vic Sarin.

The film premiered in August 1989 at the Montreal World Film Festival.

Plot
Stephen Paul Gross is a salesman who gets drawn into a sexual psychodrama between Floyd (Maury Chaykin), a sociopathic truck driver, and his daughter Dolores (Margaret Langrick), when the three are caught together in a blizzard.

The film's cast also includes Jayne Eastwood, Ted Follows, Richard Fitch and Grant Roll.

Production
The film was slated to be shot in Edmonton and Winnipeg, but had to be relocated to Ontario after production delays led the arrangements to fall through. Cynthia Preston had also been originally cast in the role of Dolores, but had to drop out after suffering injuries in a car accident, and Langrick was cast to replace her.

In 1990, Langrick reprised the role of Dolores in a Vancouver stage production of Garrard's original play.

Reception

References

External links

1989 films
1980s psychological drama films
1980s psychological thriller films
Canadian psychological drama films
Canadian psychological thriller films
English-language Canadian films
Films directed by Vic Sarin
Films based on Canadian plays
Films set in Canada
Films shot in Ontario
Films scored by Mychael Danna
1989 crime drama films
1980s English-language films
1980s Canadian films